Jozef Regec (born 29 March 1965) was a Czechoslovak national bicycle team member between 1986 and 1993 and Czech between 1993 and 2000. Born in Slovakia he represented Czechoslovakia in the men's individual road race at the 1988 Summer Olympics in Seoul.

References

External links
personal page (czech)

1965 births
Living people
Czech male cyclists
Cyclists at the 1988 Summer Olympics
Olympic cyclists of Czechoslovakia
Members of the Senate of the Czech Republic
People from Kežmarok
Sportspeople from the Prešov Region
Charles University alumni